The Constitution Alteration (Aviation) Bill 1936, was an unsuccessful proposal to alter the Australian Constitution to extend the Commonwealth legislative power in respect to air navigation and aircraft. It was put to voters for approval in a referendum held on 6 March 1937.

Question
Do you approve of the proposed law for the alteration of the Constitution entitled 'Constitution Alteration (Aviation) 1936'?

The proposal was to alter section 51 of the Constitution by adding 
(vi.A.) Air navigation and aircraft.

Background

Aviation was a subject that did not exist when the Constitution was drafted at the end of the 19th century. In 1919, Australia had entered into the Convention Relating to the Regulation of Aerial Navigation, and parliament enacted the Aircraft Navigation Act 1920, which authorised the Governor-General to make regulations to give effect to the Convention. Mr Henry was convicted of flying without a license, having flown around, over and under the Sydney Harbour Bridge. The Commonwealth relied upon 3 sources of constitutional power, interstate trade and commerce, foreign affairs and territories. The High Court held in R v Burgess; Ex parte Henry that the parliament has no general control over the subject matter of civil aviation and that implementation of the convention did not require the Commonwealth to control civil aviation. The court rejected an argument that the interstate trade and commerce power extended to activities that were commingled with interstate activities. The regulations were invalid as they went further than was necessary to carry out and give effect to the convention. The regulations were amended so they implemented the convention for aviation within a state.

A 22 page booklet was prepared setting out the arguments in favour of the proposal and those against that were endorsed by a majority of members of parliament who voted for and against the proposal.

Yes case
The argument in favor of the amendments was prepared by the Attorney-General Robert Menzies. The Sun summarised the yes case as follows:The object is to amend the Constitution to confer upon the Commonwealth Parliament the power to make laws regarding air navigation and aircraft— to enable what is obviously a national problem to be dealt with by the National Parliament.

Under existing powers the Commonwealth may control interstate but not intra-State aerial transport.

It is ludicrous that an instrument of transport so flexible and so incapable of being kept within narrow geographical limits should still be subject in many ways to six different sets of State laws, also the Commonwealth laws.

The view that an aeroplane competes with State railways, and there fore should be under State control, in the interests of transport co-ordination, becomes less tenable each year.

The real question is whether the people desire divided or uniform control.

No case
The case in opposition to the marketing referendum was prepared by New South Wales Labor members and some other members who opposed the Referendum Bill. The Sun summarised the no case as follows:In 1934. Mr. Menzies. as Acting Premier of Victoria, opposed a proposal similar to that he is now putting to the people.

The Lyons Government plans to hand over air transport to the Imperial Airways Trust. A "Yes" vote will mean dearer freights and fares for the people of every State.

The present proposal is designed to make the Imperial Air Trust, with privately subscribed capital, a serious rival of the State railway services. This same Imperial Air Trust has already begun a sinister influence in the political life of Australia.

A "Yes" vote will wreck State railway systems, in which the electors have £311,486,688 invested, and in which 79,145 are employed. A "Yes" vote would bankrupt country towns, mean dearer freights, and dearer
food, and would pave the way for an Imperial Air Trust.

The Lyons Government has no case for a referendum, and since the Goya Henry case has introduced new regulations, which are working satisfactorily.

Results

Discussion
For a referendum to approve an amendment of the constitution, it must ordinarily achieve a double majority: approved by a majority of states (i.e., four of the six states) as well as a majority of those voting nationwide. This was the first of five referendums to achieve an overall majority, but fail the requirement of a majority of states.

The uniform regulation of air navigation was achieved by uniform state laws which applied the Commonwealth regulations, and the High Court subsequently upheld the validity of those regulations.

See also
Politics of Australia
History of Australia
Aviation in Australia

References

Further reading
 Standing Committee on Legislative and Constitutional Affairs (1997) Constitutional Change: Select sources on Constitutional change in Australia 1901–1997. Australian Government Printing Service, Canberra.
 Bennett, Scott (2003). Research Paper no. 11 2002–03: The Politics of Constitutional Amendment Australian Department of the Parliamentary Library, Canberra.
 Australian Electoral Commission (2007) Referendum Dates and Results 1906 – Present AEC, Canberra.

Referendum (Aviation)
1937 referendums
1937 (Aviation)
Aviation in Australia
Aviation history of Australia